Devangaon  is a village in the southern state of Karnataka, India. It is located in the Sindgi taluk of Bijapur district in Karnataka.

Demographics
 India census, Devangaon had a population of 5380 with 2704 males and 2676 females.

See also
 Bijapur district
 Districts of Karnataka

References

External links
 http://Bijapur.nic.in/ 

Villages in Bijapur district, Karnataka